Crambophilia is a genus of moths of the family Erebidae. The genus was erected by Harrison Gray Dyar Jr. in 1914. Both species are found in Panama.

Species
Crambophilia majorcula Dyar, 1914
Crambophilia minorcula Dyar, 1914

References

Herminiinae